This article lists described species of the family Asilidae start with letter Q.

A
B
C
D
E
F
G
H
I
J
K
L
M
N
O
P
Q
R
S
T
U
V
W
Y
Z

List of Species

Genus Questopogon
 Questopogon affinis (Daniels, 1976)
 Questopogon clarkii (Dakin & Fordham, 1922)
 Questopogon guttatus (Daniels, 1976)
 Questopogon lineatus (Daniels, 1976)

References 

 
Asilidae